The 1967 World Men's Handball Championship was the sixth team handball World Championship. It was held in Sweden. Czechoslovakia won the championship.

Final standings

Results

Preliminary round

GROUP A

GROUP B

GROUP C

GROUP D

Main round
The top two teams from each group progressed to the quarter finals. The four quarter final winners progressed to the semi-finals, while losers played for positions 5-8.

5.-8.place

Source: International Handball Federation

World Handball Championship tournaments
H
H
H
January 1967 sports events in Europe